The Denver City Home Guard was a formation of militia during the American Civil War, raised from Denver City in the Colorado territory. The unit was mustered out in April 1862.

History 
In September and early October, 1861, Colorado Territorial Governor William Gilpin enlisted men for six month service, into the Denver City Home Guard, which consisted of two companies, designated No. 1 and No. 2. Joseph Ziegelmuller was the Captain of Company 1, and James W. Iddings was Captain of Company 2. Other officers for Company 1 were: 1st Lieutenant Jacob Garres, and 2nd Lieutenant William Wise. For Company 2: 1st Lieutenant John A. Latta, and 2nd Lieutenant Adamson T. Dayton. Though militia, these guards were regularly mustered into the United States service. The 200 men saw no action, but they served in Denver City and at Camp Weld, and were mustered out by Captain W. H. Bachus in March and April 1862.

See also
List of Colorado Territory Civil War units

References 

Colorado Civil War Regiments

Bibliography 

 Dyer, Frederick H. (1959). A Compendium of the War of the Rebellion. Sagamore Press; Thomas Yoseloff. New York. LCCN 59-12963.

Units and formations of the Union Army from Colorado
Colorado in the American Civil War
Military units and formations established in 1861
1861 establishments in Colorado Territory
Military units and formations disestablished in 1862